Rudarius is a genus of filefishes native to the western Pacific Ocean.

Species
The currently recognized species in this genus are:
 Rudarius ercodes D. S. Jordan & Fowler, 1902 (white-spotted pygmy filefish)
 Rudarius excelsus Hutchins, 1977 (diamond leatherjacket)
 Rudarius minutus J. C. Tyler, 1970 (minute leatherjacket)

References

Monacanthidae
Marine fish genera
Taxa named by David Starr Jordan
Taxa named by Henry Weed Fowler